İhsan Saraçlar (June 6, 1928 – January 5, 2008) was a Turkish lawyer and politician. He was born in Samsun.

From 1991 to 1995 he served as the vice-chairman of the True Path Party.  After studying law at the Istanbul University, he became an independent lawyer.  He joined the Right Path Party and was a member of the Grand National Assembly of Turkey.  He was a long-time vice president of the International Red Cross and Red Crescent Movement.  On December 30, 2007 he suffered a stroke, and died a week later in Ankara.  He was married and had three children.

External links
 Death notice 

1928 births
2008 deaths
Democrat Party (Turkey, current) politicians
Deputies of Samsun
Istanbul University Faculty of Law alumni